Vilmos "Willy" Kohut (17 July 1906 – 18 February 1986) was a Hungarian footballer who played as a striker for Ferencvárosi TC, French team Olympique Marseille and the Hungary national team. Kohut got 25 caps and 14 goals for the Hungary national team between 1925 and 1938. He represented his country at the 1938 FIFA World Cup and  scored one goal in two matches.

Honours
Hungarian League: 1926, 1927, 1928, 1932
Hungarian Cup: 1927, 1928, 1933
French Ligue: 1937
French Cup: 1935,1938
Mitropa Cup: 1928
FIFA World Cup: runners-up 1938

External links
Willy Kohut "le canon Hongrois"
Ol.Marseille Archive/Vilmos Kohut/

1906 births
1986 deaths
Footballers from Budapest
Hungarian footballers
Association football forwards
Hungary international footballers
1938 FIFA World Cup players
Ferencvárosi TC footballers
Nîmes Olympique players
Olympique de Marseille players
FC Antibes players
Nemzeti Bajnokság I players
Ligue 1 players
Hungarian football managers
Olympique de Marseille managers
Hungarian expatriate footballers
Hungarian expatriate sportspeople in France
Expatriate footballers in France